Edward George Younger, 3rd Viscount Younger of Leckie (21 November 1906 – 25 June 1997) was a Scottish nobleman.

Family background
Lord Younger of Leckie came from a Scottish family which had been making money from brewing since the 18th century, and which entered the aristocracy in the early years of the 20th century. His great-great-great-great-grandfather, George Younger (baptised 1722), was the founder of the family's brewing business, George Younger and Son. 
This George Younger's great-great-grandson, also named George Younger (1851-1929), entered politics, and was created Viscount Younger of Leckie in 1923. This peerage has passed in an unbroken line from father to son ever since.

Birth and early life
Younger was the elder son of James Younger, 2nd Viscount Younger of Leckie (1880–1946) by his wife Maud Gilmour (daughter of Sir John Gilmour, 1st Baronet). He was educated at Winchester College and New College, Oxford.

His brother Sir Kenneth Younger was the Labour Member of Parliament for Grimsby 1945–1959.

External links

Viscounts in the Peerage of the United Kingdom
1906 births
1997 deaths
Argyll and Sutherland Highlanders officers
Fife and Forfar Yeomanry officers
British Army personnel of World War II
People educated at Winchester College
Lord-Lieutenants of Stirlingshire
Lord-Lieutenants of Stirling and Falkirk